Be Careful, Mr. Smith is a 1935 British comedy film directed by Max Mack and starring Bobbie Comber, Bertha Belmore and Cecil Ramage.

The film's sets were designed by the art director John Mead.

Cast
 Bobbie Comber as Geoffrey Smith  
 Bertha Belmore as Jenny Smith 
 Cecil Ramage
 C. Denier Warren 
 Arthur Finn 
 Warren Jenkins
 Frank Atkinson 
 Marie Daine 
 Bertha Ricardo 
 Ernest Sefton

References

Bibliography
 Low, Rachael. Filmmaking in 1930s Britain. George Allen & Unwin, 1985.
 Wood, Linda. British Films, 1927-1939. British Film Institute, 1986.

External links

1935 films
British comedy films
1935 comedy films
Films directed by Max Mack
British black-and-white films
Films shot at British International Pictures Studios
1930s English-language films
1930s British films